Colin Gordon Graham (7 June 1929 – 26 March 2020) was a New Zealand cricketer. He played five first-class matches for Otago between 1954 and 1956.

Graham was born at Dunedin and educated at Otago Boys' High School, as was his older brother Archibald Graham. He worked as a teacher. Graham died on 26 March 2020.

References

1929 births
2020 deaths
New Zealand cricketers
Otago cricketers
Cricketers from Dunedin